Dean Refram (November 8, 1936 – July 28, 1991) was an American professional golfer and golf course architect.

Refram was born in Miami, Florida. He attended Florida Southern College in Lakeland, Florida, and was a member of the golf team.

Refram played on the PGA Tour in the 1960s and 1970s. He won twice on tour: the 1968 Robinson Open and the 1975 Walt Disney World National Team Championship with Jim Colbert.

After leaving the Tour in 1975, Refram spent the latter part of his career as a golf course designer and architect. Most of the courses he designed were in Florida.

Refram died in Tampa, Florida at age 54 of respiratory problems complicated by cancer. His son, Dean Refram Jr., also is a professional golfer.

Golf courses

Original design
Bear Slide Golf Club
Cypress Creek Golf Club
Links of Lake Bernadette
Pinebrook Ironwood Golf Course
The Golf Club at Summerbrooke

Closed
Baytree Golf Club

Professional wins (2)

PGA Tour wins (2)

Results in major championships

Note: Refram never played in The Open Championship.

CUT = missed the half-way cut
"T" indicates a tie for a place

References

External links

American male golfers
Florida Southern Moccasins men's golfers
PGA Tour golfers
Golf course architects
Golfers from Tampa, Florida
Golfers from Miami
1936 births
1991 deaths